Neoeriocitrin is a 7-O-glycoside of the flavanone eriodictyol and the disaccharide neohesperidose (α-L-rhamnopyranosyl-(1→2)-β-D-glucopyranose).
Note that the 'neo' in the name in this case does not refer to the position of the B-ring (which is not in a neo position), but refer to the glycosyl moiety.

References

External links

Flavanone glycosides